The 2021 Louisville Cardinals football team represented the University of Louisville during the 2021 NCAA Division I FBS football season. This was the team's third season under head coach Scott Satterfield. The Cardinals played their home games at Cardinal Stadium in Louisville, Kentucky, and competed as a member of the Atlantic Coast Conference (ACC).

Schedule

Source:

Rankings

References

Louisville
Louisville Cardinals football seasons
Louisville Cardinals football